Albert Earle "Bud" Ings (February 5, 1926 – March 20, 2015) was a Canadian politician, who served in the Legislative Assembly of Prince Edward Island from 1970 to 1982. He represented the electoral district of 3rd Kings as a member of the Prince Edward Island Liberal Party.

Born in Mount Herbert, Prince Edward Island, Ings graduated from the Ontario Veterinary College in 1952. He served in the Executive Council of Prince Edward Island as Minister of Agriculture and Minister of Health. In 2008, he published his first book, Mud, Sweat and Tears : Tales from a Country Vet, and in 2010, published Vet Behind the Years : More Tales from a Country Vet.

In 2009, Ings was inducted into the Atlantic Agricultural Hall of Fame. In 2012, Ings was appointed to the Order of Prince Edward Island. Ings died in Montague, Prince Edward Island on March 20, 2015.

References

1926 births
2015 deaths
People from Kings County, Prince Edward Island
Prince Edward Island Liberal Party MLAs
Canadian veterinarians
Male veterinarians
Members of the Executive Council of Prince Edward Island
Members of the Order of Prince Edward Island
Writers from Prince Edward Island
21st-century Canadian non-fiction writers
21st-century Canadian male writers
Canadian male non-fiction writers